Rosemont Historic District in Martinsburg, West Virginia, is a historic district that was listed on the National Register of Historic Places in 2002.

References

Colonial Revival architecture in West Virginia
Historic districts in Martinsburg, West Virginia
Houses on the National Register of Historic Places in West Virginia
Queen Anne architecture in West Virginia
Houses in Martinsburg, West Virginia
Historic districts on the National Register of Historic Places in West Virginia